The Richard 125 Commuter is a two-passenger homebuilt aircraft design.

Development
The 125 Commuter was introduced in 1969, and a second refined prototype was built in 1972. The aircraft used an stressed skin all aluminum structure at a time when most homebuilts used wood or tube and fabric construction. The plans were marketed for homebuilt construction by its designer Charles Richard. A 150 hp variant was developed afterward.

Design
The 125 Commuter is a side-by-side passenger strut-braced high wing aircraft with conventional landing gear. The aircraft uses all metal construction. A single control column between the seats acts as a control for either pilot. Fuel is stored in 50 gallon wing tanks.

Variants
Richard 150 Commuter

Specifications (Richard 125 Commuter)

See also

References

Homebuilt aircraft
125
High-wing aircraft
Single-engined tractor aircraft